Richard Disney (by 1505 – 30 March 1578) was an English Member of Parliament.

He was born the son of William Disney of Norton Disney and succeeded his father in December 1540.

He was a Member (MP) of the Parliament of England for Grantham in April 1554.
He was a Justice of the Peace for Kesteven from 1547 to 1564 and served as High Sheriff of Lincolnshire for 1556–57 and 1566–67.

He had married twice:firstly Neile, the daughter and coheiress of Sir William Hussey of Beauvale, Nottinghamshire. with whom he had 7 sons and 5 daughters and secondly Jane, the daughter of Sir William Askew of Nuthall, Nottinghamshire and widow of George St. Poll (d. 1558/59) of Snarford, Lincolnshire.

References

1578 deaths
English MPs 1554
High Sheriffs of Lincolnshire
Year of birth uncertain